José Luis Pineda Sierra (born February 4, 1990 in Acapulco de Juárez, Guerrero), known as José Pineda, is a Mexican professional association football (soccer) player who plays for C.D. Tepatitlán de Morelos.

External links
 

Liga MX players
Living people
Mexican footballers
1990 births
People from Acapulco
Association football forwards
21st-century Mexican people